The Nock Mountains ( or Nockgebirge) are the westernmost and highest mountain range of the Gurktal Alps in Austria, spread over parts of the federal states of Carinthia, Salzburg and Styria. Their appearance is characterised by numerous dome-like and grass-covered summits (Nocken). Their highest peak is  the Eisenhut in Styria which reaches an elevation of  AA.

In July 2012 the Nock Mountains and the adjacent Lungau region were designated a biosphere reserve by UNESCO. They were largely unglaciated in the Ice Age and were a glacial refugium.

Geography

As westernmost part of the Gurktal Alps, the Nock Mountains are separated from the Low Tauern in the north, stretching as far as the Katschberg Pass in the west, by the Mur River. In the west, the rivers Lieser and Drau separate the Nock Mountains from the Ankogel Group of the High Tauern and from the Gailtal Alps. South of Lake Ossiach they are adjoined by the lower Sattnitz range and the Klagenfurt Basin, another part of the Gurktal Alps. To the east, within the Gurktal Alps they are bounded by a line from Gurk via Flattnitz Pass to the Paalbach stream.

The Nock Mountains may be divided into eight subgroups. South of Bad Kleinkirchheim are the stocks of the Mirnock massif with a significant topographic prominence of 1,343 m, the Wöllaner Nock and the Gerlitzen high above Lake Ossiach. The central region of the Nock Mountains is formed by the Millstätter Alpe and the Rosennock, the highest summit in Carinthia. In the north are the stocks of the Schwarzwand, the Königstuhl in Salzburg, which is also a tripoint, and the Eisenhut.

The range has also been referred to in German language tourist brochures as the "Nocky Mountains", an allusion to the Rocky Mountains.

National park

The central area formed the Nock Mountains national park established by the Carinthian state government on 1 January 1987. The remote area had already been developed with the construction of the scenic Nockalm Road from 1979. Further plans for a skiing region were averted by a citizens' initiative and a referendum in 1980, whereby 94% of the voters declared themselves against the project.

Despite its name, the Nationalpark Nockberge was designated a protected landscape (Category V) according to IUCN protected area categories.

References

External links

 Nock Mountains Biosphere Park

Mountain ranges of the Alps
Mountain ranges of Carinthia (state)
Mountain ranges of Salzburg (state)
Mountain ranges of Styria
Protected areas of the Alps